Il Travaso delle idee, mostly known as Il Travaso, (Italian: The Decanter of Ideas) was a satirical magazine which was in circulation between 1900 and 1966 with an interruption in the period 1944–1946. Its subtitle was Organo ufficiale delle persone intelligenti (Italian: Official Organ of Intelligent People). The magazine was headquartered in Rome, Italy.

History and profile
Il Travaso was launched in 1900 and had its headquarters in Rome. The magazine temporarily ceased publication in 1944 when the fascist rule in Italy ended. It was restarted in Rome in 1946 and published until 1966.

Il Travaso was published by Giornale d'ltalia on a weekly basis. The company was owned by Filiberto Scarpelli, Carlo Montani and Enrico Novelli. The editor of Il Travaso was the Italian cartoonist Guglielmo ‘Guasta’ Guastaveglia. The magazine featured cartoons and political satire and adopted a moderate-conservative political stance. In the period between 1952 and 1953 its political leaning was described as nationalistic. Some of the contributors were futurist artists, including Luciano Folgore. Two volumes of Il Travaso were dedicated to futurism which were published on 11 January 1931 and on 24 September 1933. The magazine had readers from different social classes.

During the fascist period in Italy Il Travaso published anti-semitic materials which also included a violent version of the religious antisemitism. For instance, in April 1938 a poem by the 19th century Italian poet Giacommo Belli was published in the weekly which claimed that Jews were the murderers of Jesus and that it was legitimate to hate them. Following the racial laws the magazine featured anti-semitic caricatures between the late November and the mid-December in 1938 presenting the Jews as a social and economic burden.

The magazine sold 150,000 copies in 1952–1953. In the 1950s Benito Jacovitti, a well-known Italian cartoonist, was one of the contributors of Il Travaso. Another contributor was Achille Campanile.

References

1900 establishments in Italy
1966 disestablishments in Italy
Antisemitism in Italy
Antisemitic publications
Conservatism in Italy
Conservative magazines
Defunct political magazines published in Italy
Italian Futurism
Italian-language magazines
Italian political satire
Magazines established in 1900
Magazines disestablished in 1966
Magazines published in Rome
Satirical magazines published in Italy